In finite group theory, a p-stable group for an odd prime p is a finite group satisfying a technical condition introduced by  in order to extend Thompson's uniqueness results in the odd order theorem to groups with dihedral Sylow 2-subgroups.

Definitions

There are several equivalent definitions of a p-stable group.

First definition.

We give definition of a p-stable group in two parts.

1. Let p be an odd prime and G be a finite group with a nontrivial p-core . If , then .

Now, define  as the set of all p-subgroups of G maximal with respect to the property that .

2. Let G be a finite group and p an odd prime.

Second definition.

Let p be an odd prime and H a finite group.

Properties

If p is an odd prime and G is a finite group such that SL2(p) is not involved in G, then G is p-stable.

See also

p-stability is used as one of the conditions in Glauberman's ZJ theorem.
Quadratic pair
p-constrained group
p-solvable group

References

 

Finite groups